Aerial roots are roots above the ground. They are almost always adventitious. They are found in diverse plant species, including epiphytes such as orchids (Orchidaceae), tropical coastal swamp trees such as mangroves, banyan figs (Ficus subg. Urostigma), the warm-temperate rainforest rata (Metrosideros robusta), and pohutukawa trees of New Zealand (Metrosideros excelsa). Vines such as common ivy (Hedera helix) and poison ivy (Toxicodendron radicans) also have aerial roots.

Types of aerial roots
This plant organ that is found in so many diverse plant-families has different specializations that suit the plant-habitat. In general growth-form, they can be technically classed as negatively gravitropic (grows up and away from the ground) or positively gravitropic (grows down toward the ground).

"Stranglers" (prop-root)
Banyan trees are an example of a strangler fig that begins life as an epiphyte in the crown of another tree. Their roots grow down and around the stem of the host, their growth accelerating once the ground has been reached. Over time, the roots coalesce to form a pseudotrunk, which may give the appearance that it is strangling the host.

Another strangler that begins life as an epiphyte is the Moreton Bay fig (Ficus macrophylla) of tropical and subtropical eastern Australia, which has powerfully descending aerial roots. In the subtropical to warm-temperate rainforests of northern New Zealand, Metrosideros robusta, the rata tree, sends aerial roots down several sides of the trunk of the host. From these descending roots, horizontal roots grow out to girdle the trunk and fuse with the descending roots. In some cases, the "strangler" outlives the host tree, leaving as its only trace a hollow core in the massive pseudotrunk of the rata.

Pneumatophores
These specialized aerial roots enable plants to breathe air in habitats that have waterlogged soil. The roots may grow down from the stem, or up from typical roots. Some botanists classify these as aerating roots rather than aerial roots, if they come up from soil. The surface of these roots is covered with lenticel (small pores) which take up air into spongy tissue, which in turn uses osmotic pathways to spread oxygen throughout the plant as needed.
Pneumatophores differentiate the black mangrove and grey mangrove from other mangrove species.

Fishers in some areas of Southeast Asia make corks for fishing nets by shaping the pneumatophores of mangrove apples (Sonneratia caseolaris) into small floats.

Members of the subfamily Taxodioideae produce woody above ground structures, known as cypress knees, that project upward from their roots.  These structures were initially thought to function as pneumatophores, but recent experiments have failed to find evidence for this hypothesis.

Haustorial roots 
These roots are found in parasitic plants, where aerial roots become cemented to the host plant via a sticky attachment disc before intruding into the tissues of the host. Mistletoe is a example of this.

Propagative roots
Adventitious roots usually develop from plantlet nodes formed via horizontal, above ground stems, termed stolons, e.g., strawberry runners, and spider plant.

Some leaves develop adventitious buds, which then form adventitious roots, e.g. piggyback plant (Tolmiea menziesii) and mother-of-thousands (Kalanchoe daigremontiana). The adventitious plantlets then drop off the parent plant and develop as separate clones of the parent.

Aerial root pumping and physiology
Aerial roots may receive water and nutrient intake from the air. There are many types of aerial roots; some, such as mangrove, are used for aeration and not for water absorption. In other cases, they are used mainly for structure, and in order to reach the surface. Many plants rely on the leaf system for gathering the water into pockets, or onto scales. These roots function as terrestrial roots do.

Most aerial roots directly absorb the moisture from fog or humid air.

Some surprising results in studies on aerial roots of orchids show that the velamen (the white spongy envelope of the aerial roots), are actually totally waterproof, preventing water loss but not allowing any water in. Once reaching and touching a surface, the velamen is not produced in the contact area, allowing the root to absorb water like terrestrial roots.

Many other epiphytes - non-parasitic or semi-parasitic plants living on the surface of other plants - have developed cups and scales that gather rainwater or dew. The aerial roots in this case work as regular surface roots.  There are also several types of roots, creating a cushion where a high humidity is retained.

Some of the aerial roots, especially in the genus Tillandsia, have a physiology that collects water from humidity, and absorbs it directly.

In the Sierra Mixe (named after the geographical area) variety of maize, aerial roots produce a sweet mucus that supports nitrogen fixing bacteria, which supply 30–80 percent of the plant's nitrogen needs.

Aerial roots on houseplants 

Many plants that are commonly grown indoors can develop aerial roots, such as Monstera Deliciosa, Pothos (Epipremnum aureum), Rubber Tree (Ficus elastica), Fiddle Leaf Fig (Ficus lyrata), Thaumatophyllum bipinnatifidum, many philodendrons and succulents such as Echeveria.

Aerial roots on houseplants do not serve as much of a purpose as on outdoor plants, as there is no rain indoors and indoor humidity is often low due to A/C and heating systems. However, studies have shown that increasing indoor humidity can result in houseplant aerial roots growing longer in length, resulting in lower levels of transpiration and more efficient intake of nitrogen than aroid houseplants grown in standard indoor humidity. Aerial roots on houseplant cuttings increase the chances of successful propagation. 

The presence of aerial roots is not an indicator of plant health. If a plant doesn't have aerial roots, that is no reason for concern.

See also 
 Adventitious
 Root
 Vegetative reproduction
 Vine
 Aeroponics

References 

Plant roots
Orchid morphology